La Reine et le Cardinal is a 2009 French television film directed by Marc Rivière and starring Alessandra Martines and Philippe Torreton in the title roles. It is based on events in the early years of the reign of Louis XIV of France. The drama of the rumored love affair between the child king's widowed mother, Anne of Austria, and her prime minister, Cardinal Mazarin, unfolds as intrigue and political discord ignite the Fronde. The second part of the film covers the romance between Louis XIV and Mazarin's niece, Marie Mancini and ends with the death of Mazarin. Broadcast in two parts, it lasts over three hours. Marc Rivière won a best director awards at the La Rochelle TV festival

Synopsis 
At the death of Richelieu, Cardinal Mazarin the king Louis XIII appoints him as First Minister and godfather to the child dauphin. The queen, Anne d'Autriche, seeing in Mazarin a continuation of the policies of Richelieu to whom she was opposed eventually allows herself to be won over by his diplomacy and charm. Becoming regent on the death of the king, she makes him her First Minister and advisor to the regent. Their collusion extends beyond politics to a secret liaison.

The tax burden created by Mazarin makes him unpopular and quickly confronted by the Fronde, forcing him to take refuge with the royal family at Saint-Germain-en-Laye. He is opposed by the Prince de Condé who, risking royal wrath, takes the side of the Fronde against the cardinal.

The second half of the telefilm opens with Mazarin's exile with his sister and nieces at the Augustusburg and Falkenlust Palaces, Brühl from where he continues to observe state affairs. After the coronation of Louis XIV  he is able finally to return to France and be reunited with the queen, with whom he had continued in correspondence. His niece Marie Mancini and the young king fall in love, but the exigences of the state over-rule them, and Mazarin removed Marie from court and organises a marriage between the young king and the infanta of Spain. Mazarin dies having overseen the progression of France towards an absolute monarchy.

Cast 
 Philippe Torreton : Cardinal Mazarin
 Alessandra Martines : Anne d'Autriche
 Nicolas Vaude : le Jean François Paul de Gondi
 Marc Citti : Jeure
 Cyril Descours : Louis XIV de France
 Carla Buttarazzi : Marie Mancini
 Joséphine de Meaux : Madame de Motteville
 Christophe Reymond : Gaston d’Orléans
 Audrey Fleurot : la duchesse de Longueville
 Rudi Rosenberg : le prince de Condé, ex-duc d’Enghien
 Xavier de Guillebon : La Rochefoucauld
 Samuel Theis : Beaufort
 Philippe du Janerand : Louis XIII
 Geoffroy Thiebaut : Villeroy
 Jean Dell : Gaspar de Guzmán, Count-Duke of Olivares, ambassadeur d'Espagne
 Laurent Claret : Henri, Prince of Condé (1588–1646)
 Sylvie Degryse : Princesse de Condé
 Barbara Probst : Olympe Mancini
 Sylvie David : Geronima Mazzarini
 Bernard Valais : Pierre Séguier
 Rufus (actor) : Richelieu
 Franck de La Personne : Colbert

References

External links 
 

2009 television films
2009 films
French television films
2000s French-language films
Cultural depictions of Cardinal Mazarin
Works about Louis XIV